Biemna is a genus of sea sponges in the family Biemnidae.

Species
The following species are recognised in the genus Biemna:
 Biemna anisotoxa Lévi, 1963
 Biemna bihamigera (Dendy, 1922)
 Biemna caribea Pulitzer-Finali, 1986
 Biemna chilensis Thiele, 1905
 Biemna chujaensis Sim & Shim, 2006
 Biemna ciocalyptoides (Dendy, 1897)
 Biemna cribaria (Alcolado & Gotera, 1986)
 Biemna dautzenbergi Topsent, 1890
 Biemna ehrenbergi (Keller, 1889)
 Biemna fistulosa (Topsent, 1897)
 Biemna flabellata Bergquist, 1970
 Biemna fortis (Topsent, 1897)
 Biemna fragilis (Kieschnick, 1900)
 Biemna gellioides Lévi & Lévi, 1989
 Biemna granulosigmata Lévi, 1993
 Biemna hongdoensis Jeon & Sim, 2008
 Biemna humilis Thiele, 1903
 Biemna jeolmyongensis Sim & Shim, 2006
 Biemna laboutei Hooper, 1996
 Biemna liposigma Burton, 1928
 Biemna liposphaera (Hentschel, 1912)
 Biemna macrorhaphis Hentschel, 1914
 Biemna megalosigma Hentschel, 1912
 Biemna megastyla (Burton, 1959)
 Biemna microacanthosigma Mothes, Hajdu, Lerner & van Soest, 2004
 Biemna microstrongyla (Hentschel, 1912)
 Biemna microstyla de Laubenfels, 1950
 Biemna microxa Hentschel, 1911
 Biemna mnioeis de Laubenfels, 1954
 Biemna novaezealandiae Dendy, 1924
 Biemna omanensis van Soest & Beglinger, 2002
 Biemna partenopea Pulitzer-Finali, 1978
 Biemna pedonculata Lévi, 1963
 Biemna peracuta Topsent, 1927
 Biemna plicata (Whitelegge, 1907)
 Biemna polyphylla Lévi, 1963
 Biemna rhabderemioides Bergquist, 1961
 Biemna rhabdostyla Uriz, 1988
 Biemna rhabdotylostylota Van Soest, 2017
 Biemna rhadia de Laubenfels, 1930
 Biemna rufescens Bergquist & Fromont, 1988
 Biemna saucia Hooper, Capon & Hodder, 1991
 Biemna seychellensis Thomas, 1973
 Biemna spinomicroxea Mothes, Campos, Lerner, Carraro & van Soest, 2005
 Biemna strongylota Rios & Cristobo, 2006
 Biemna tenuisigma Pulitzer-Finali, 1978
 Biemna tetraphis Tanita & Hoshino, 1989
 Biemna thielei Burton, 1930
 Biemna thomasi Cavalcanti, Santos Neto & Pinheiro, 2018
 Biemna trirhaphis (Topsent, 1897)
 Biemna trisigmata Mothes & Campos, 2004
 Biemna truncata Hentschel, 1912
 Biemna tubulata (Dendy, 1905)
 Biemna variantia (Bowerbank, 1858)
 Biemna victoriana Hallmann, 1916

References

Poecilosclerida
Sponge genera